Survival is the final serial of the 26th season of the British science fiction television series Doctor Who, which was first broadcast in three weekly parts on BBC1 from 22 November to 6 December 1989. It is also the final story of the series' original 26-year run; it did not return regularly until 2005. It marks the final regular television appearances of Sylvester McCoy as the Seventh Doctor and Sophie Aldred as Ace, and is also the final appearance of Anthony Ainley as the Master, the latter appearing alongside McCoy's Doctor for the only time.

Journalist Matthew Sweet has described Survival as "a parable about Thatcherism" that shares multiple characteristics with the later David Tennant era of Doctor Who. The Doctor brings Ace home to Perivale, where her friends have been transported to the planet of the Cheetah People.

Plot
The Seventh Doctor brings Ace back home to Perivale in west London. Ace becomes worried when most of her old friends seem to have disappeared, but the Doctor is more preoccupied with the black cat he sees skulking about. The cat appears to be selecting people and transporting them to another dimension. Ace finds herself being hunted down by a creature on horseback, which seems to be half-human, half-cheetah, and which hunts in tandem with the black cat. Later the Doctor and a keep-fit instructor called Paterson are chosen and teleported to another world, where the Doctor is greeted by his nemesis the Master.
 
The Master explains the complex situation: they are on a sentient planet, which has the power to transform its inhabitants into animals. The formerly human inhabitants, which have since evolved into Cheetah People, originally bred the black cats as pets. The Master himself shows signs of transformation and needs the Doctor's help to escape from the planet.

Ace finds her friends, Shreela and Midge, who are hiding in some woods with a young man called Derek. A Cheetah pack attacks and during the fight Midge kills one Cheetah while Ace injures another, called Karra. She begins to form an attachment to Karra and nurses her, tending her injuries, which worries the Doctor greatly. Ace's eyes change and she begins to transform into a Cheetah herself.

Midge submits to the power of the planet and begins to transform. The Master seizes on this and uses Midge to teleport them both back to Earth and away from the dying world. Ace helps The Doctor get back to Perivale, also enabling Paterson, Derek and Shreela to flee the strange planet. The Doctor and Ace return to Perivale, where they find Midge and the Master have killed Paterson for sport. Midge too is killed in the Master's machinations. Karra's arrival brings comfort to Ace, whose transformation is continuing, but the Master kills Karra too.

The Master transports the Doctor with him back to the Cheetah Planet for a final conflict but the Doctor resists the pull of the planet, turning away from violence, and is transported away from the dying world. However, the Master looks doomed on the planet as it begins to break up. The Doctor has gone back to the TARDIS and Earth, where he finds Ace, whose metamorphosis has reversed.

Production

Writing
Writer Rona Munro approached script editor Andrew Cartmel at a BBC scriptwriting workshop and said that she'd "kill to write for Doctor Who." The story Munro developed incorporated themes including the morals of hunting (personified by the Cheetah People and signposted by Ace's friend Ange collecting for hunt saboteurs). The title Survival was chosen by Cartmel. Munro was disappointed by the realisation of the Cheetah People:

Recording
Survival was one of only a handful of Doctor Who serials to be recorded completely on BBC Outside Broadcast video, instead of the mix of OB and studio video that was more common during the late 1980s, and the mix of film and video that was usual before them. The other stories to be recorded solely on OB video were The Sontaran Experiment (1975), Delta and the Bannermen (1987), Silver Nemesis (1988) and The Curse of Fenric (1989).

It was almost  on the shooting days for the scenes on the planet of the Cheetah people. One of the extras removed her costume (revealing that she was wearing very little underneath) and simply walked off the set, causing delays while a replacement was found. The battle at the climax of the story was recorded and is set on the site of the ancient hill fort at Horsenden Hill, Perivale. The majority of location recording was done in and around Perivale, with small sections shot at nearby Ealing, outside and near The Drayton Court pub.

The final Doctor Who episode in the original series
Having already surmised that episode three of Survival was likely to at least be the last episode of Doctor Who for some time, and possibly the last ever, the show's producer John Nathan-Turner decided close to transmission that a more suitable conclusion should be given to the final episode. To this end, script editor Andrew Cartmel wrote a short, melancholic closing monologue for actor Sylvester McCoy, which McCoy recorded on 23 November 1989, the day after episode one was broadcast and, by coincidence, the show's twenty-sixth anniversary:

"There are worlds out there where the sky is burning, the sea's asleep, and the rivers dream. People made of smoke, and cities made of song. Somewhere there's danger, somewhere there’s injustice, and somewhere else the tea's getting cold. Come on, Ace – we've got work to do!"

This was dubbed over the closing scene as the Doctor and Ace walked off into the distance, apparently to further adventures. Although Survival was the last Doctor Who serial of the original series to be transmitted, it was not the last to have been produced; that was Ghost Light, which had been broadcast some weeks earlier, as the antepenultimate story of the original run. The Doctor Who production office at the BBC finally closed down in August 1990, having been in continuous operation since 1963.

This story is the last to feature Anthony Ainley as the Master. Ainley was not asked to return as the Master for the 1996 Doctor Who television movie. Instead, Gordon Tipple was cast as the Master for the prologue and Eric Roberts played the Master for the rest of the movie. Ainley reprised the role of the Master for the 1997 computer game Destiny of the Doctors. He continued to be active in Doctor Who, attending conventions and recording a commentary track for the DVD of the 1981 serial The Keeper of Traken. Ainley died in May 2004.

McCoy and Aldred would reprise their roles onscreen on a number of occasions: first in a 1990 episode of the educational series Search Out Science; and again in 1993, along with many other former Doctor Who actors, for the Children in Need special Dimensions in Time. McCoy would briefly return to the role for the 1996 Doctor Who television movie which saw the Seventh Doctor regenerate into the Eighth Doctor, played by Paul McGann, and once more in 2021 for a webcast trailer promoting the blu-ray release of Season 24 alongside Bonnie Langford as Mel Bush.

Had the series continued, Aldred would have remained in her role until the expiry of her contract midway through the following season. Ace was to be written out of the series in Ice Time, an Ice Warrior story written by Marc Platt. Aldred returned as Ace in 2019 for a webcast trailer promoting the blu-ray release of Season 26.

In 1999, McCoy agreed to reprise his role as the Doctor in officially-licensed Doctor Who audio adventures produced by Big Finish, with Aldred also returning the following year. As of 2022, both McCoy and Aldred continue to make regular appearances in Doctor Who audio releases and associated spin-offs. The pair also returned in 2001 for the BBC webcast production, Death Comes to Time.

Doctor Who eventually returned to television as a BBC Wales production in 2005, helmed by Russell T Davies. In 2022, Aldred made a special guest appearance as Ace in the revived series, alongside Janet Fielding as Tegan Jovanka, for the BBC's centenary – "The Power of the Doctor" – which saw the end of Jodie Whittaker's tenure as the Thirteenth Doctor and was the last story produced entirely by BBC Studios before entering a co-production deal with Bad Wolf. McCoy also made a surprise cameo as a manifestation of the Seventh Doctor.

Cast notes
The part of Karra in this serial is played by Lisa Bowerman, who is now more familiar to fans as the voice of Bernice Summerfield in the Big Finish Productions audio dramas. She is also a director of many Big Finish productions, and also returned to the Doctor Who series proper when she provided voice-acting work for the animated special Dreamland in 2009.

This serial features guest appearances of the comedians Gareth Hale and Norman Pace, and actress Adele Silva (as an 8-year-old, in her first television role). See also Celebrity appearances in Doctor Who.

Broadcast and reception

There was no direct indication given to the public that this was to be the final regular instalment of Doctor Who; however, unlike previous years' final episodes, this one featured no announcement in the closing credits that the programme would return the following year.

Reviewing Survival, David J. Howe and Stephen James Walker described it as "a very good story", with a
script that contains "highly imaginative and original concepts". They also expressed admiration for the special effects used for the Cheetah People's planet, 
calling them "superb electronic video effects". Ainley's performance was also praised, with the reviewers
stating it was "deadly serious and implacably evil, but with occasional flashes of dark humour". 
While stating that it was "deeply regrettable" that the original series of Doctor Who had to end with Survival, they added "that it went out on such a high note is, however, something to be thankful for".

The serial was also positively received by Paul Cornell, Martin Day and Keith Topping, who praised Anthony Ainley's performance and considered the show to be "a great end to the series" with "an epic quality".

Commercial releases

In print

A novelisation of this serial, written by Rona Munro, was published by Target Books in October 1990, making Munro the third woman to write a Doctor Who novelisation. A reprint edition was one of several possible books included with a 2008 issue of Doctor Who Magazine.

Home media

Survival was released on VHS in October 1995. It was released on DVD on 16 April 2007 as a 2-disc set and as part of the Doctor Who: The Collection Season 26 blu-ray box set released in 2020. It is the only story from season 26 not to have an alternate extended cut. This serial was released as part of the Doctor Who DVD Files collection, in issue 51, published 15 December 2010.

Soundtrack release

The music from this serial, composed by Dominic Glynn, was first released on CD on 15 September 2017.

Track listing

References

External links

Guide to the Perivale locations used in Survival
Doctor Who Locations - Survival

Target novelisation

Seventh Doctor serials
British television series finales
The Master (Doctor Who) television stories
1989 British television episodes
Doctor Who stories set on Earth
Fiction set in 1989
Television episodes set in London